Mordellistena florissantensis is a beetle in the genus Mordellistena of the family Mordellidae. It was described in 1912 by Wickham.

References

florissantensis
Beetles described in 1912